Titanites is an extinct ammonite cephalopod genus within the family Dorsoplanitidae, that lived during the late Tithonian of the Late Jurassic.

Description
Species of the genus Titanites can reach large sizes, with a diameter of about 1.37 m for Titanites occidentalis. They were fast-moving nektonic carnivores.

See also
 Cephalopod size

References
 Universal Biological Indexer
 The Paleobiology Database

Jurassic ammonites
Jurassic animals of Asia
Perisphinctoidea
Ammonitida genera